Pristimantis yustizi is a species of frogs in the family Strabomantidae.

It is endemic to Venezuela.
Its natural habitat is subtropical or tropical moist montane forests.
It is threatened by habitat loss.

References

yustizi
Endemic fauna of Venezuela
Amphibians of Venezuela
Frogs of South America
Amphibians described in 2004
Taxonomy articles created by Polbot